McQuillan and MacQuillan are surnames of Irish origin. There are several unrelated origins of the surnames McQuillan and MacQuillan.

The Ulster variant of the surname was claimed to be an anglicisation of the Gaelic Mac Uighilín (son of Hugelin), the name allegedly adopted by the family of Hugelin de Mandeville. The de Mandevilles were a Cambro-Norman family and had conquered an area of north Antrim. In reality the de Mandevilles sold their estates in northern Antrim to the McQuillans of County Down. Both families had previously held the office of "constable of the bonnaght" for the Earldom of Ulster – a system adopted from the Irish where mercenaries were hired to act as a body of standing troops. The McQuillans renamed the lands they acquired "the Route", derived from their "rout", a common term then for a private army.

These McQuillans played a large role in the history of County Antrim

List of persons with the surname
Malcolm MacQuillan (died 1307), Scottish magnate
Adrian McQuillan (born 1965), Northern Irish politician
George McQuillan (1885–1940), American Major League baseball pitcher
Jack McQuillan (1920–1998), Irish politician
Jack McQuillan (footballer) (1885–1941), English Footballer
Jim McQuillan (computer programmer), founder and project leader of the Linux Terminal Server Project
Jim McQuillan (darts player) (born 1940), Irish former darts player
John McQuillan (footballer) (born 1970), Scottish former professional footballer
Matt McQuillan (born 1981), Canadian professional golfer
Michael McQuillan (Gaelic footballer), Irish Gaelic football player
Michael McQuillan (mathematician), Scottish mathematician
Rachel McQuillan (born 1971), retired Australian professional tennis player
Tony McQuillan (born 1951), Australian Test cricket match umpire

See also
McQuilken
McQuillen

Notes

Surnames
Anglicised Scottish Gaelic-language surnames
Anglicised Irish-language surnames